Aleksej Nešović (born March 14, 1985) is a Bosnian professional basketball player. Standing at  he plays at the point guard position. He also represented the Bosnia and Herzegovina national basketball team internationally.

References

External links
 Aleksej Nesović at aba-liga.com
 Aleksej Nesović at acb.com
 Aleksej Nesović at eurobasket.com
 Aleksej Nesović at euroleague.com
 Aleksej Nesović at fiba.com

1985 births
Living people
ABA League players
Aliağa Petkim basketball players
Baloncesto Fuenlabrada players
Basketball League of Serbia players
Bosnia and Herzegovina men's basketball players
Bosnia and Herzegovina expatriate basketball people in Poland
Bosnia and Herzegovina expatriate basketball people in Serbia
KK Borac Čačak players
KK Budućnost players
KK Crvena zvezda players
KK Ergonom players
KK Hemofarm players
KK Mladost Zemun players
KK Radnički Kragujevac (2009–2014) players
KK Olimpija players
KK Zagreb players
KK Proleter Zrenjanin players
Liga ACB players
Olympias Patras B.C. players
OKK Beograd players
OKK Novi Pazar players
Point guards
Serbs of Bosnia and Herzegovina
Basketball players from Sarajevo
KK MZT Skopje players
Asseco Gdynia players
Bosnia and Herzegovina expatriate basketball people in Montenegro
Bosnia and Herzegovina expatriate basketball people in Spain
Bosnia and Herzegovina expatriate basketball people in Germany
Bosnia and Herzegovina expatriate basketball people in Greece
Bosnia and Herzegovina expatriate basketball people in Slovenia
Bosnia and Herzegovina expatriate basketball people in Turkey
Bosnia and Herzegovina expatriate basketball people in Cyprus
Bosnia and Herzegovina expatriate basketball people in North Macedonia